Ward Keeler is an American anthropologist who conducted fieldwork in Java in Indonesia during the New Order area.

He worked in predominantly Surakarta cultural areas, and studied wayang as a means of understanding specific manifestation of Javanese ways of thinking.

His book Javanese, a cultural approach was a Javanese language text for English speakers that provided learners with language expressions for learning, rather than elaborate on the complexities of hierarchy within the language and culture.

More recently he has studied Burmese culture

See also
Clifford Geertz

Publications 
 Javanese shadow puppets  Singapore :Oxford University Press,1992. 
 Javanese shadow plays, Javanese selves Princeton, N.J. :Princeton University Press,c1987. 
 Javanese, a cultural approach  Athens :Ohio University Center for International Studies,1984. 
 Symbolic dimensions of the Javanese house  Melbourne, Vic. :Centre of Southeast Asian Studies, Monash University,1983. 
 Fighting for democracy on a heap of jewels . Clayton, Vic. :Monash Asia Institute,1997. 
 Mangunwijaya, Y. B.,1929- Durga/Umayi :a novel /Y. B. Mangunwijaya ; translated by Ward Keeler. Seattle ;London :University of Washington Press in association with Singapore University Press,c2004. 
 Father puppeteer  Chicago, Ill. :University of Chicago,1982. 
 Puppet theater of the Javanese ; Puppet theater of the Sundanese / Kathy Foley. New York, N.Y. :Festival of Indonesia Foundation,c1991.

Notes

American anthropologists
American male writers
Year of birth missing (living people)
Living people